FIFA Women's World Cup qualification is the process a national women's association football team goes through to qualify for the FIFA Women's World Cup.

Qualifying tournaments are held within the six FIFA continental zones (Africa, Asia, North and Central America and Caribbean, South America, Oceania, Europe), and are organized by their respective confederations. For each tournament, FIFA decides beforehand the number of berths awarded to each of the continental zones, based on the relative strength of the confederations' teams. The hosts of the World Cup receive an automatic berth in the finals. For the 2015 and 2019 FIFA Women's World Cups, the number of finalists increased from 16 to 24. Since 2023, the number is 32.

All confederation, except for the UEFA, hold qualification process throughout continental tournaments. The UEFA organises its own qualification phase since 1999.

Qualification berths by continent

The table below lists the numbers of berths allocated by FIFA for each continent in each tournament.

Intercontinental play-offs are played as two home-and-away matches. The team that scores a greater aggregate number of goals qualifies for the World Cup. Away goals rule applies. If these rules fail to determine the winner, extra time and penalty shootouts are used.

"H" denotes an automatic spot for the host. Places in intercontinental play-offs are represented as fractions, with a place in a direct play-off being counted as 0.5 spots.

1 In 1991, China PR hosted the tournament, but the location was determined after Asian qualifying had been completed.
2 Originally to be held in China PR, the tournament was moved to the United States. China retained its automatic qualifying status as original host.

Qualification competition entrants over time

1 Only teams in European Class A could qualify for the Women's World Cup finals.  Other sides could at best be promoted to Class A for subsequent tournament.
2 A second Guatemalan side also competed, but their matches are not included in the list.
3 The United States (eventual hosts of the finals) competed in the qualifying tournament.

First appearance in qualification by team
Listed are the first appearance in the qualifying stages by a national team. Teams that entered for the first time but withdrew are written in italics.

National teams results in World Cup preliminary competition (1991–2023)

The table is updated after 2019 FIFA Women's World Cup qualification in all continents except for Asia (AFC), which is already updated the 2023 FIFA Women's World Cup qualification.

Other
List update 2023 qualification

Footnotes

See also
 National team appearances in the FIFA Women's World Cup
 FIFA World Cup qualification

References

External links